Anacomp, Inc., is an American company that specializes in computer services and document management.  It was founded in Indianapolis, Indiana, in 1968 by Ronald D. Palamara, Robert R. Sadaka, and J. Melvin Ebbert, three professors at Purdue University. Their goal was to direct  the power of the computer toward the disciplines of investment management, education, urban analysis, computer science and civic systems, but is now headquartered in Chantilly, Virginia. The name Anacomp is a combination of the words ANAlyze and COMPute. Since its inception, Anacomp has made many acquisitions and spin-offs and has entered and exited different lines of business.

, Anacomp's business was primarily in the service and document management sectors. In 2010, Anacomp sold off its CaseLogistix product line to Thomson Reuters. CaseLogistix is a document review application used by law firms for document review and subsequent case preparation.

See also
 Document management system
 Graham Magnetics

References

External links
 Company homepage

Technology companies established in 1968
Privately held companies based in Virginia
Computer companies of the United States
1968 establishments in Indiana